"You Oughta Know" is a song by Canadian singer-songwriter Alanis Morissette, released as the lead single from her third studio album, Jagged Little Pill (1995), on July 6, 1995. After releasing two studio albums, Morissette left MCA Records Canada and was introduced to manager Scott Welch. Morissette began working on new music after moving from her hometown of Ottawa to Toronto, but made little progress. In Los Angeles, she met producer Glen Ballard, with whom she wrote songs including "You Oughta Know".

"You Oughta Know" signaled Morissette's departure from bubblegum pop to alternative rock, and features guitarist Dave Navarro, and bassist Flea of Red Hot Chili Peppers. Drummer Taylor Hawkins played in her touring band before joining Foo Fighters but does not contribute to the track. It outperformed the label's expectations and received positive reviews. After the influential Los Angeles modern rock radio station KROQ-FM began playing it, the single reached the top ten in Canada, Australia and the United States. It was a multiformat hit in several US genre charts, and made the top 40 in Belgium, Iceland, the Netherlands, New Zealand, Sweden and the United Kingdom.

A music video was directed by Nick Egan. The single was added in the set list for Morissette's 1995 world tour; since then, it has been included in her albums MTV Unplugged (1999), Feast on Scraps (2002), and The Collection, as well as 1997 Grammys and the MTV Unplugged compilation albums. It has received numerous accolades; in 1996, the single was nominated for three Grammy Awards, winning the awards for Best Rock Song and Best Female Rock Vocal Performance. In 2021, the song was listed at #103 in the Rolling Stone's 500 Greatest Songs of All Time.

Background
In 1991, MCA Records Canada released Morissette's debut studio album Alanis, which went platinum in Canada. This was followed by her second album, Now Is the Time, but it was a commercial failure, selling only a little more than half the copies of her first album. With her two-album deal with MCA Records Canada complete, Morissette was left without a major label contract. In 1993, Morissette's publisher Leeds Levy at MCA Music Publishing introduced her to manager Scott Welch. Welch told HitQuarters he was impressed by her "spectacular voice", her character and her lyrics. At the time she was still living with her parents. Together they decided it would be best for her career to move to Toronto and start writing with other people.

After graduating from high school, Morissette moved from Ottawa to Toronto. Her publisher funded part of her development and when she met producer and songwriter Glen Ballard, he believed in her talent enough to let her use his studio. The two wrote and recorded Morissette's first internationally released album, Jagged Little Pill, and by the spring of 1995, she had signed a deal with Maverick Records. According to Welch, every label they had approached had passed on Morissette apart from Maverick.

Recording and mix
Ballard met Morissette on March 8, 1994, after his publishing company matched them up. According to Ballard, the connection was "instant", and within 30 minutes of meeting each other, they had begun experimenting with different sounds in Ballard's home studio in San Fernando Valley, California. Ballard also declared to Rolling Stone, "I just connected with her as a person, and, almost parenthetically, it was like 'Wow, you're 19?' She was so intelligent and ready to take a chance on doing something that might have no commercial application. Although there was some question about what she wanted to do musically, she knew what she didn't want to do, which was anything that wasn't authentic and from her heart."

"You Oughta Know" was co-written by Morissette and Ballard. Morissette stated that she wrote the song from her "subconscious": "I wasn't aware of what was coming out of me. I'd go into the booth when the ink wasn't even dry and sing. I'd listen the next day and not really remember it." The demo was recorded on November 28, 1994, and additional vocals were recorded on November 30. Initial rhythm recording began with Los Angeles engineer Chris Fogel on December 1, 1994. Matt Laug played drums and Lance Morrison played bass. On December 5, Benmont Tench of Tom Petty and the Heartbreakers recorded Hammond organ. Additional guitars were recorded on December 9.

In early 1995, LA producer Jimmy Boyle recruited guitarist Dave Navarro and bassist Flea of the Red Hot Chili Peppers to play on the track. According to Navarro, "There were no guide tracks, we just had the vocal to work from.... and we basically jammed until we found something we were both happy with. Alanis was happy too." Flea said, "When I first heard the track, it had a different bassist and guitarist on it; I listened to the bassline and thought, 'That's some weak shit!' It was no flash and no smash! But the vocal was strong, so I just tried to play something good."

Two mixes of the song appear on Jagged Little Pill. Track 2 was mixed by Chris Fogel, and is the most widely known version of the song.  Track 13 is the "Jimmy the Saint Blend" and was mixed by Jimmy Boyle and it was only used in the original music video from 1995, replaced in 2020 by the Chris Fogel mix.

Lyrical interpretation
Morissette has never publicly identified anyone as the ex-boyfriend portrayed in the song. In 2008, she said,
Well, I've never talked about who my songs were about and I won't, because when I write them they're written for the sake of personal expression. So with all due respect to whoever may see themselves in my songs, and it happens all the time, I never really comment on it because I write these songs for myself, not other people.

Nonetheless, in comments made on different occasions, actor-comedian Dave Coulier has alternatively admitted to and denied being the subject of the song. In 1997, the Boston Herald reported that Coulier "admitted the lines are very close to home. Especially the one about 'an older version of me' and bugging him [Coulier] 'in the middle of dinner.'" Coulier's former television co-star Bob Saget said in one interview that he was present when Morissette made that call during dinner. In the 2021 documentary Jagged, Morissette denied the song is about Coulier.

Other celebrities have been rumoured to be the lover in the song, including: Mike Peluso, hockey player for the New Jersey Devils; Matt LeBlanc, the actor who appeared in the video for Morissette's single "Walk Away" in 1991; and Leslie Howe, a musician and the producer of Morissette's first two albums in the early 1990s.

Release and reception
Maverick Records released Jagged Little Pill internationally in 1995. The album was expected only to sell enough for Morissette to make a follow-up, but the situation changed quickly when KROQ-FM, an influential Los Angeles modern rock radio station, began playing "You Oughta Know", which was released as the album's first single. 
The song instantly garnered attention for its scathing, explicit lyrics.

Upon release "You Oughta Know" was met with positive reviews from critics. Stephen Thomas Erlewine of AllMusic praised the song's "vengeful" lyrics and stated that the song propelled the album's success and encouraged the public to embrace the "women in rock" movement. Steve Baltin from Cash Box wrote that here, the singer "comes out of the box with the same scintillating sensuality that marked Sophie B. Hawkins’ coming out song, "Damn, I Wish I Was Your Lover". When the 20-year old Morissette sings, “Are you thinking of me when you fuck her”, ears can't help but stand up at attention. The brilliantly emotive song is sung with just the right blend of anger and passion." David Browne of Entertainment Weekly also praised the single's lyrical content, calling them "spiteful and seething" continuing to state that Morissette was able to turn "jealous bile into something worth hearing." Chuck Campbell from Knoxville News Sentinel felt it "promises to be one of the year's most memorable songs", remarking that it "belongs to Morissette, who builds to a rage-filled chorus". He added, "Her stunned reaction to being unceremoniously dumped may belie her age (21), but jilted souls of all ages can connect with the bitterness." A reviewer from Music & Media commented, "Jeez, this woman is really cross. Her man has walked away with 'another', and she can't hide that jealousy, which is stirred by a mean beat and an aggressively rocking wah guitar." British magazine Music Week gave it three out of five, adding, "The Canadian songstress shows startling maturity for her years, and this debut single from her album Jagged Little Pill is made all the stronger by guests Flea and Dave Navarro of the Chili Peppers." David Sinclair from The Times wrote, "The arrangement bustles along, thanks to the rugged bass and guitar-playing (...), gradually building to a knockout punch of a chorus. But the song's tremendous thrust derives primarily from Morissette herself as she nails down a rapid succession of home truths with vengeful enthusiasm."

Commercial performance

The song was only a modest hit in Morissette's native Canada at first, initially reaching number 20 on the RPM Top Singles chart and number 21 on the RPM Rock/Alternative chart concurrently with its peak chart performance in the United States; it then began to decline on the charts before having a late rally in the fall to reach a new peak chart position of number six in the week of October 16, the week after the album's second single "Hand in My Pocket" debuted on the chart. Music journalists have attributed the song's uneven chart performance to resistance from Canadian radio programmers, because the aggressive, hard rock nature of the song marked a dramatic shift from Morissette's established image as a teen dance-pop star. Even in Morissette's own hometown of Ottawa, most radio stations resisted the song, with contemporary hit radio stations deeming it too rock-oriented for their formats and rock stations deeming it too dance-pop. It was the only single from the album not to hit number one or two on the Canadian pop charts. Despite the song's initially poor chart performance, however, the video reached number one on MuchMusic and number three on MusiquePlus in the summer, and overall album sales of Jagged Little Pill were comparable to those in the United States even while the single's performance was faltering.

"You Oughta Know" received moderate to major success worldwide. In New Zealand, the song was released twice: once as a solo single, then as a double A-side with "Ironic" in 1996. The solo release saw the song peak at number 25 and stay in the top 50 for 25 nonconsecutive weeks, while the re-release with "Ironic" allowed the song to reach number three. It was certified gold by Recorded Music NZ (RMNZ), for shipments of 15,000 copies.
Most notably, the song was a top ten hit in three different genre charts in the United States, peaking at number three on the active rock charts, seven on the contemporary hit radio charts and number one for five weeks on the Billboard Alternative Songs chart, retaining the record for longest run by a woman atop that chart until it was surpassed by Lorde's "Royals" in 2013. In addition, the song was a top ten hit in Australia, and reached the top 40 in Belgium, the Netherlands, and Sweden.

The song saw some success in the United Kingdom, debuting at number seventy six on the week ending of July 25, 1995; over the course of the next few weeks "You Oughta Know" rose to fifty three, forty and finally peaked at twenty two. The song held its peak position for a second week before falling to number thirty, the song continued to drop on the charts and after eight weeks it fell off the charts completely.

Music video
Directed by Nick Egan and produced by Mark Fetterman, the accompanying music video for the track was filmed in the Mojave Desert. In the video, Morissette aggressively runs around the desert landscape and sings into a microphone on a mock-up stage with her then band-members performing – including Taylor Hawkins. Throughout the video, Morissette switches from a short black dress to a white tank-top and coat, to a blue silk shirt in the climax – all signifying her change in image.

Promotion
The single was added in the set list for Morissette's concert tour, Jagged Little Pill World Tour (1995). The song was added to the tour's video album Jagged Little Pill Live (1997). Since then, the song has been included in her albums MTV Unplugged (1999), Feast on Scraps (2002), and The Collection, as well as 1997 Grammys and the MTV Unplugged compilation albums.

Impact and legacy
"You Oughta Know" was ranked at number twelve on VH1's 100 Greatest Songs of the 90's in December 2007.  
In 1996, the single was nominated for three Grammy Awards, winning the awards for Best Rock Song and Best Female Rock Vocal Performance but losing the Grammy Award for Song of the Year to Seal's song "Kiss from a Rose".
Additionally, the song entered About.coms "Top 10 Alanis Morissette Lyrics" list at number 3, with Bill Lamb picking the lyrics, "And every time you speak her name, Does she know how you told me, You'd hold me until you died, Till you died, but you're still alive" as the best.

Cover versions

Since the song's initial release, it has been covered by numerous artists. American musician and parodist "Weird Al" Yankovic utilized a portion of this song for The Alternative Polka, which appeared on his album Bad Hair Day, released the year after the song was released. Richard Cheese and Lounge Against the Machine covered the song in a comedic lounge music style on their 2005 album Aperitif for Destruction.

Britney Spears performed the song during her 2009 The Circus Starring Britney Spears tour. Mike Bruno of Entertainment Weekly wrote, "she rocked it. What better way to silence the critics than to step up to the mic, say to hell with it all, and spew some of that bile. Hot, confident Britney, live vocals, a dash of rebellion…" After a number of Jonathan Coulton's fans compared Morissette's cover of "My Humps" to his cover of "Baby Got Back", he covered "You Oughta Know" himself.

The song was sampled by American R&B singer Beyoncé during her 2009 I Am... World Tour, her I Am… Yours residency in Las Vegas, as well as at the 2010 Grammys and the Glastonbury Festival 2011.

In August 2015, Taylor Swift invited Morissette on stage in Los Angeles to sing the song with her. Many of Swift's fans at the concert, who had been born since the song's release, expressed bewilderment as to her identity. In Slate, Amanda Marcotte suggested it was better they didn't, criticizing the song in the process. "I am happy for these teenagers who don't know who Alanis Morissette is. I envy you, teens," she wrote. "[W]eirdly enough, 'You Oughta Know' was held up in 1995 as some kind of feminist anthem of empowerment, an angry yalp of rebellion from ladies who had enough," she recalled. While she found nothing wrong with that idea in principle, she compared Morissette's perspective in the song to men who lash out at women who they believe have put them in the "friend zone." "It's still a song about refusing to take no for an answer. This is a 'yes means yes' world. There's no reason for the teens of this world to know anything about Alanis Morissette."

On November 22, 2015, Demi Lovato and Morissette teamed up to perform "You Oughta Know" at the 2015 American Music Awards. The performance was met with critical acclaim and turned out to be "one of the most talked-about moments" of the 2015 edition of the awards show.

Released March 25, 2022, Season 2 Episode 5 of the Netflix drama Bridgerton included a classical strings rendition of "You Oughta Know", appropriately placed in a break-up scene shortly after male romantic interest Anthony had indeed "bugged her in the middle of dinner". The version in the episode is instrumental, but Netflix also "got a Alanis to sing along with the special cover"

Track listing
 CD single "You Oughta Know"
 "You Oughta Know" (The Jimmy the Saint Blend)
 "Perfect" (acoustic)
 "Wake Up"

Personnel
The following people contributed to "You Oughta Know":Musicians Alanis Morissette – vocals 
 Glen Ballard – programming
 Dave Navarro – guitar 
 Flea – bass 
 Benmont Tench – organ 
 Matt Laug – drumsEngineering'''
 Chris Fogel – recording and mix
 Chris Bellman – mastering
 Jimmy Boyle – additional recording and mix

Charts

Weekly charts

Year-end charts

Certifications

See also
 "The Terrorist Attack", an episode of Curb Your Enthusiasm that includes the identity of the song's subject as a joke
 "You're So Vain", a Carly Simon song with another mystery subject
 "P.S. I Love You", a song performed by Cobie Smulders in character as "Robin Daggers" Scherbatsky in the eponymous episode of How I Met Your Mother'', parodying the controversy of "You Oughta Know", including the suspicion that the subject is Dave Coulier.

References

1995 singles
Alanis Morissette songs
Songs with feminist themes
Songs written by Glen Ballard
Songs written by Alanis Morissette
Grammy Award for Best Female Rock Vocal Performance
Grammy Award for Best Rock Song
Songs about jealousy
Juno Award for Single of the Year singles
Maverick Records singles
Reprise Records singles